Henry the Black may refer to:

 Henry III, Holy Roman Emperor (1017–1056)
 Henry IX, Duke of Bavaria (died 1126) 
 Enrique of Malacca, a servant of Ferdinand Magellan